Tarlos Thomas (born August 23, 1977) is a former American football offensive tackle. He played college football at Florida State. Undrafted in the 2001 NFL Draft after missing most of his senior season due to anterior cruciate and medial collateral ligaments injuries, he spent the 2002 season on the Houston Texans roster.

References

External links 
Florida State Seminoles bio

1977 births
Living people
American football offensive tackles
Florida State Seminoles football players
Houston Texans players
People from Monticello, Florida